Love to Love You may refer to:

Love to Love You Baby (album), an album by Donna Summer
"Love to Love You Baby" (song), a song from the album
"Love to Love You" (Cristy Lane song), 1981
"Love to Love You" (The Corrs song), 1996
"Love to Love You (And Tonight Pigs Will Fly)", a song by Caravan from In the Land of Grey and Pink

See also
Love to Love (disambiguation)
Love to Love You Baby (disambiguation)